A pattern book, or architectural pattern book, is a book of architectural designs, usually providing enough for non-architects to build structures that are copies or significant derivatives of major architect-designed works.

A number of pattern books have been very influential in spreading architectural styles.  

An early author of pattern books was American architect Minard Lafever. In 1829 he published The Young Builders' General Instructor, followed by Modern Builders' Guide in 1833, The Beauties of Modern Architecture in 1835 and The Architectural Instructor in 1850. His pattern books were influential in spreading his Greek Revival style, which is known as the first major non-British high architectural style in the United States.  The style was popular for being not British, and for association with Greek history, ancient and modern, and was greatly facilitated by the pattern books.

Orson Squire Fowler notably made a mark on American architecture when he touted the advantages of octagonal homes over rectangular and square structures in his widely publicized book, The Octagon House: A Home For All, or A New, Cheap, Convenient, and Superior Mode of Building, printed in the year 1848. It is argued by some that this is incorrectly termed a pattern book, but as a result of this popular and influential publication, a few thousand octagonal houses were in fact erected in the United States.

Another was Samuel Skidmore's Tudor Homes of England, which introduced Tudor and Norman elements, such as turrets, stained-glass windows, and spiral staircases into American architecture.

Palliser, Palliser & Company published nine pattern books, the first of which sold for $.25 and achieved wide distribution, during the period from 1876 to 1896.

After the American Civil War, Second Empire architecture was considered the perfect style for many to demonstrate their wealth and express their new power in their respective communities. The style diffused by the publications of designs in pattern books and adopted the adaptability and eclecticism that Italianate architecture had when interpreted by more middle-class clients. This caused more modest homes to depart from the ornamentation found in French examples in favor of simpler and more eclectic American ornamentation that had been established in the 1850s. In practice, most Second Empire houses simply followed the same patterns developed by Alexander Jackson Davis and Samuel Sloan, the symmetrical plan, the L-plan, for the Italianate style, adding a mansard roof to the composition. Thus, most Second Empire houses exhibited the same ornamentational and stylistic features as contemporary Italianate forms, differing only in the presence or absence of a mansard roof. Second Empire was also a frequent choice of style for remodeling older houses. Frequently, owners of Italianate, Colonial, or Federal houses chose to add a mansard roof and French ornamental features to update their homes in the latest fashions.

Urban Design Associates, of Pittsburgh, PA, developed design guidelines, called a Pattern Book, as a tool for the design of new architecture within the community.

See also
Pattern (architecture)
A Pattern Language

References

Architecture books